Last Essays is a volume of essays by Joseph Conrad, edited with an introduction by Richard Curle, and published posthumously in 1926 (London & Toronto: J. M. Dent & Sons).

The volume includes nineteen shorter pieces, mainly written by Conrad for various newspapers and magazines after the publication of Notes on Life and Letters in 1921. Together with the 1978 volume The Congo Diary and Other Uncollected Pieces, edited by Zdzislaw Najder, they contain all of Conrad's miscellaneous writing.

The essays in Last Essays are mainly about sea travel or literature. They contain many passages of interest to the enthusiast. The volume contains "Legends", the unfinished essay Conrad was working on when he died, and "The Congo Diary", Conrad's first known writing, since often reprinted, and of great interest to the student of Heart of Darkness. It also contains Conrad's preface to Curle's Into the East (1921), in which Conrad laments the passing of an earlier form of travel and its replacement by tourism.

"The Dover Patrol" was commissioned by Lord Northcliffe in 1921 for the unveiling of a monument commemorating the British naval efforts in protecting the English Channel during World War I.

List of contents
 Geography and Some Explorers 
 The "Torrens": A Personal Tribute
 Christmas Day at Sea
 Ocean Travel
 Outside Literature
 Legends
 The Unlighted Coast
 The Dover Patrol
 Memorandum on the Scheme for Fitting-Out a Sailing Ship
 The Loss of the "Dalgonar"
 Travel
 Stephen Crane
 His War Book: A Preface to Stephen Crane's The Red Badge of Courage
 John Galsworthy
 A Glance at Two Books (The Island Pharisees by John Galsworthy and Green Mansions by W. H. Hudson)
 Preface to "The Shorter Tales of Joseph Conrad"
 Cookery: Preface to Jessie Conrad's A Handbook of Cookery for a Small House
 The Future of Constantinople
 The Congo Diary

References

External links
 Full text of Last Essays at the Internet Archive

1926 essays
Essays by Joseph Conrad
J. M. Dent books
1926 books